The Kunisch Mountains (– meaning "Royal Forest") is a range that includes part of the Bavarian Forest and the central Bohemian Forest, with its main chain between the Osser and the Zwercheck close to Upper Palatinate. From a geological perspective the Kunisch Mountains occupy a special position, because they are made of mica schist instead of the gneisses and granites that are common elsewhere in the Bavarian Forest. It has good farming soils and heavy precipitation which often falls as snow and ice in winter.

Literature 
 Im Landes der künischen Freibauern. Heimatbuch für den mittleren Böhmerwald. (Landkreis Bergreichenstein und angrenzende Gebiete); Herausgeber: Volkskundlicher Arbeitskreis für den mittleren Böhmerwald "Künische Freibauern" e.V., Verlag Morsak, Grafenau (Niederbayern) 1979, pp. 5–839.
 Johanna von Herzogenberg: Zwischen Donau und Moldau. Bayerischer Wald und Böhmerwald - Das Mühlviertel und Südböhmen. Prestel-Verlag, Munich, 1968, pp. 5–350. (with an overview map)
 Südböhmen. In: Lillian Schacherl: Böhmen - Kulturbild einer Landschaft. Prestel-Verlag, Munich, 1966, pp. 139–212.

External links 
 Aktionsbündnis - Künisches Gebirge
 The Kunisch Mountains from above; videos.

Bohemian Massif
Mountain ranges of Germany
Mountain ranges of the Czech Republic
Bavarian Forest
Bohemian Forest
Cham (district)